SMDC refers to the United States Army Space and Missile Defense Command.

SMDC may also refer to:

 St. Mary's/Duluth Clinic Health System in Duluth, Minnesota
 Saskatchewan Mining Development Corporation, a former provincial crown corporation in Saskatchewan, Canada
 SM Development Corporation, a subsidiary of Philippine company SM Investments
 Sunshine Maritime Development Corporation, owner of the oil tanker involved in the 2006 Guimaras oil spill
 Shalamar Medical and Dental College, Lahore, Pakistan
 Sharif Medical and Dental College, Lahore, Pakistan